Thomas Peacock may refer to:

 Thomas Peacock (businessman), South Australian businessman and politician
 Thomas Peacock (politician) (1837–1922), New Zealand politician
 Thomas Bevill Peacock (1812–1882), English physician
 Thomas Love Peacock (1785–1866), English author
 Tom Peacock (1912–?), English educator and footballer

See also
 John Thomas Peacock (1827–1905), New Zealand politician
 Peacock (surname)